Krzysztof Jerzy Wielicki (born 5 January 1950) is a Polish alpine and high-altitude climber, regarded as one of the greatest Polish climbers in history. He is the fifth man to climb all fourteen eight-thousanders and the first ever to climb Mount Everest, Kangchenjunga, and Lhotse in winter. He is a member of The Explorers Club.

Life
He was born on 5 January 1950 in Szklarka Przygodzicka, Greater Poland. He graduated from the Wrocław University of Science and Technology (WUST) where he studied electronics. He chaired the Tourism Committee in the Polish Students' Association at the Faculty of Electronics at the WUST. He started climbing in Sokoliki in May 1970. In 1972, he participated in his first climbing course and a winter camp led by Wanda Rutkiewicz.

In 1973, he achieved first major international climbing successes during a camp in the Dolomites. Together with Bogdan Nowaczyk, he became the first climber to complete within one day the Via Italiano-Francese on Punta Civetta. He later travelled to climb in the Caucasus Mountains, Hindu Kush and Pamir Mountains.

On 17 February 1980, as a member of Polish national expedition led by Andrzej Zawada, Wielicki and fellow climber Leszek Cichy became the first to climb an eight-thousander in the winter. He was also the first to make successful winter ascents of Mount Everest, Kangchenjunga, and Lhotse, three out of four highest mountains in the world.

He climbed Broad Peak during a solo expedition and made the first ever ascent of an eight-thousander from a base within 24 hours. He climbed Dhaulagiri and Shishapangma alone establishing new routes. He also made a solo ascent of Gasherbrum II and Nanga Parbat, a feat that was only witnessed by a few Pakistani shepherds. He participated in a number of expeditions on K2. In 1996, he made an ascent of the mountain along the north pillar together with two Italian climbers.

He organized the 2002-2003 Polish winter expedition on K2, which failed to reach the summit. He made another attempt to climb an eight-thousander in the winter by organizing an expedition on Nanga Parbat (2006-2007) but was forced to turn back due to adverse weather conditions. In 2013, he led an expedition to climb Broad Peak in the winter. On 5 March, Adam Bielecki, Artur Małek, Maciej Berbeka and Tomasz Kowalski reached the summit for the first time in history during winter (Berbeka and Kowalski died while descending from the mountain). In 2018, he led another unsuccessful expedition to reach the summit of K2 in the winter.

In January 2022, he released his autobiography entitled Solo. Moje samotne wspinaczki (Solo. My Solitary Climbs) which "delves into the climber’s circumstances, emotions and motivations that led him to undertake each of his solitary ascents".

Recognition
In 2001, he received the Lowell Thomas Award conferred by The Explorers Club. He was awarded the Commander's Cross of the Order of Polonia Restituta in 2003, for his outstanding achievements in alpinism and for popularizing the sport of climbing. In 2015, he was awarded Wrocław University of Science and Technology Medal for his achievements in alpinism.

In 2017, the International Astronomical Union approved the name of asteroid discovered by Vincenzo Silvano Casulli as 173094 Wielicki in honour of the Polish climber.

In 2018, he received jointly with Reinhold Messner the Princess of Asturias Award in the category of Sports. The 2019 Piolet d'Or was awarded in September 2019 to Wielicki as the 11th Lifetime Achievement award.

Major ascents

See also
Jerzy Kukuczka
Wanda Rutkiewicz
List of eight-thousanders

References

External links
 Interview with Krzysztof Wielicki
 Krzysztof Wielicki the famous Polish climber./ Version polish and english /
 Krzysztof Wielicki - Polish Winter Expedition 1980
 Polish winter expedition to K2, 2002/3 /Version polish and english/

1950 births
Living people
Polish mountain climbers
Polish summiters of Mount Everest
Summiters of all 14 eight-thousanders
People from Ostrzeszów County
Sportspeople from Greater Poland Voivodeship
Summiters of K2
Piolet d'Or winners